Cosgrove may refer to:

Places 
 Cosgrove, Northamptonshire, England
 Cosgrove, Queensland, Australia
 Cosgrove, Victoria, Australia
 Cosgrove, Arkansas, United States
 Cosgrove, Iowa, United States

People 
 Bill Cosgrove (1918–1943), Australian rules footballer
 Clayton Cosgrove (born 1969), New Zealand politician 
 Daniel Cosgrove (born 1970), American actor
 Denis Cosgrove (1948–2008), British geographer
 Frank J. Cosgrove (1914–1980), American politician
 Gertrude Cosgrove (1882–1962), Australian activist
 Hazel Cosgrove, Lady Cosgrove (born 1946), Scottish  lawyer and judge
 Henry Cosgrove (1834–1906), American Roman Catholic bishop
 Henry Cosgrove (judge) (1922–2010), Australian judge
 Jack Cosgrove (disambiguation), several people
 James Cosgrove (comedian), English comedian
 James Cosgrove (politician) (1861–1911), American politician
 John Cosgrove (disambiguation), several people
 Kevin Cosgrove (1955–2001), American business executive
 Mark Cosgrove (born 1984), Australian cricketer
 Mike Cosgrove (born 1951), American baseball player
 Mike Cosgrove (footballer) (1901–1972), Scottish footballer
 Mike Cosgrove, American drummer, member of Alien Ant Farm
 Miranda Cosgrove (born 1993), American actress
 Paul Cosgrove (born 1934), Canadian politician and jurist
 Peter Cosgrove (born 1947), Retired Australian army general, Australian Governor-General 2014-2019
 Robert Cosgrove (1884–1969), Australian politician
 Stephen Cosgrove (footballer) (born 1980), Scottish footballer
 Stephen Cosgrove (writer) (born 1945), American children's writer
 Stuart Cosgrove (born 1952), Scottish broadcaster, journalist and television executive
 Toby Cosgrove (born 1940), American surgeon
 William Cosgrove (1888–1936), Irish soldier

Fictional characters 
 Ken Cosgrove, account executive on Mad Men
 Sergeant Mike Cosgrove, a character from Freakazoid!
 Dave Kosgrove, a character from South Beach Tow

See also 
 Cosgrave